Vytautas Petrulis (born February 3, 1890 in Katelišės, near Vabalninkas; executed in 1942, near Uchta, RSFSR) was a Lithuanian politician, one of the main figures in the Lithuanian Christian Democratic Party, and an accountant. He is often nicknamed "the father of the Litas" as it was during his term as Minister of Finance that the Lithuanian litas was introduced.

In summer 1918, Petrulis became a member of the Council of Lithuania. Later he was acting Minister of Finance in the 3rd Cabinet of Lithuania. He was Minister of Finance, Trade and Industry in the 7th, 8th, and 9th cabinets. In the 10th cabinet he was appointed as Minister of Finance. He was Prime Minister of Lithuania in the 11th Cabinet, also acting as Minister of Finance. He was the speaker of Seimas from 1925 to 1926.

On July 11, 1940 he was arrested by the Soviets and sent to the Kaunas Prison. In 1942, he was executed by firing squad because of anti-Soviet activities near Uchta.

References

External links
 Bio at Lithuanian Seimas website

1890 births
1942 deaths
People from Biržai District Municipality
People from Ponevezhsky Uyezd
Lithuanian Christian Democratic Party politicians
Prime Ministers of Lithuania
Ministers of Finance of Lithuania
Speakers of the Seimas
Lithuanian accountants
Lithuanian people executed by the Soviet Union
Executed prime ministers